Box Elder is a 2008 American independent film. It was written and directed by Todd Sklar, his first feature film. The film stars Alex Rennie, Nick Renkoski, Chad Haas, as well as Sklar.

Plot 
Box Elder follows best friends and roommates, John Scott (Sklar) Alex, Nick, and Chad (Haas) through their final years of college at the University of Missouri. The loose narrative structure is anchored by John's breakup with his girlfriend Laura (Hina Abdullah). The four dudes party, eat sandwiches, and repeatedly ignore their scholastic responsibilities.

Cast

Distribution 
In the Spring of 2008, Sklar and a number of cast and crew from the film toured the film from city to city, mostly focusing on college campuses and art-house cinemas. Sklar, via his distribution company, Range Life Entertainment, entered into direct 50-50 revenue-sharing deals with the majority of the theaters at which Box Elder screened.  According to the filmmaker at numerous post-screening Q&A sessions, Sklar will be bringing Box Elder, along with a number of other films, back on the road and into theaters in the fall of 2008.

Critical reception 
During the film's engagement at the Gene Siskel Film Center in Chicago, Time Out Chicago gave the film 3 stars and said it, "plays like a cross between Richard Linklater’s Slacker and TV’s Seinfeld." The Chicago Reader gave a brief review, praising, "the dialogue has actual wit in addition to the usual ironic gloss and Sklar's vision of college is the fond fiction we all like to remember in adulthood."

Soundtrack

References

External links 
 
 
 Vox Magazine - Box Elder and the Sundance kid

2008 films
2008 independent films
2008 comedy films
2000s sex comedy films
Films set in Columbia, Missouri
Films shot in Columbia, Missouri
Teen sex comedy films
American independent films
American sex comedy films
2000s English-language films
2000s American films